This is a list of English football transfers for the 2004–05 season. Only moves featuring at least one Premier League or First Division club are listed.

The summer transfer window opened on 1 July 2004, although a few transfers took place prior to that date. Players without a club may join one at any time, either during or in between transfer windows. Clubs below Premier League level may also sign players on loan at any time. If need be, clubs may sign a goalkeeper on an emergency loan, if all others are unavailable. Clubs are able to purchase players again in January when the window re-opens.

Transfers
28 April 2004
Fabien Barthez from Manchester United to Marseille, free

May

17 May 2004
Robin Van Persie from Feyenoord to Arsenal, £2.75 million
18 May 2004 
Emile Heskey from Liverpool to Birmingham City, £6.25m
25 May 2004
Giovanni van Bronckhorst from Arsenal to Barcelona, Undisclosed

June

3 June 2004 
Juan Sebastián Verón from Chelsea to Inter Milan, two season-long loan
Martin Albrechtsen from FC Copenhagen to West Bromwich Albion, £2.7m
Muzzy Izzet from Leicester City to Birmingham City, free
7 June 2004
Paul Dickov from Leicester City to Blackburn Rovers, £150k
8 June 2004 
Petr Čech from Rennes to Chelsea, £12m
Arjen Robben from PSV to Chelsea, £7m
11 June 2004 
Gabriel Heinze from Paris Saint-Germain to Manchester United, £6.9m
14 July 2004
Dion Dublin from Aston Villa to Leicester City, free
Paul Butler from Wolverhampton Wanderers to Leeds United, free
18 June 2004
Darren Purse from Birmingham City to West Bromwich Albion, £500k
22 June 2004 
Paulo Ferreira from Porto to Chelsea, £13.2m
23 June 2004
Marcus Bent from Ipswich Town to Everton, £450k
Julian Gray from Crystal Palace to Birmingham City, free

July

1 July 2004 
Dennis Rommedahl from PSV to Charlton Athletic, £1.4m 
2 July 2004 
James Milner from Leeds United to Newcastle United, £3.6m
5 July 2004 
Les Ferdinand from Leicester City to Bolton Wanderers, free
6 July 2004 
Michael Reiziger from Barcelona to Middlesbrough, free
7 July 2004
Dominic Matteo from Leeds United to Blackburn Rovers, free
8 July 2004 
Mark Viduka from Leeds United to Middlesbrough, £4.5m
9 July 2004 
Peter Crouch from Aston Villa to Southampton, £2m
Jimmy Floyd Hasselbaink from Chelsea to Middlesbrough, free
Hélder Postiga from Spurs to Porto, £5m
Pedro Mendes from Porto to Tottenham Hotspur, £2m
Mario Melchiot from Chelsea to Birmingham City, free
Sean Davis from Fulham to Tottenham Hotspur, Undisclosed
12 July 2004 
Mateja Kežman from PSV to Chelsea, £5m
Jesper Grønkjær from Chelsea to Birmingham City, £2.2m
Lomana LuaLua from Newcastle United to Portsmouth, £1.7m (making a previous loan deal permanent)
David Unsworth from Everton to Portsmouth, free
14 July 2004 
Teddy Sheringham from Portsmouth to West Ham United, free
15 July 2004 
Hernán Crespo from Chelsea to AC Milan, season-long loan
16 July 2004 
Markus Babbel from Liverpool to VfB Stuttgart, Undisclosed
18 July 2004
Andy Cole from Blackburn Rovers to Fulham, free
20 July 2004 
Didier Drogba from Marseille to Chelsea, £24m
Martin Keown from Arsenal to Leicester City, free
David Connolly from West Ham United to Leicester City, £500k
Tiago from Benfica to Chelsea
21 July 2004 
Patrick Kluivert from Barcelona to Newcastle United, free
Gary Speed from Newcastle United to Bolton Wanderers, £750k
Hugo Viana from Newcastle United to Sporting Lisbon season-long loan
22 July 2004 
Thomas Helveg from Inter Milan to Norwich City, free
23 July 2004 
Bobby Convey from Major League Soccer (D.C. United) to Reading, Undisclosed
Tomasz Radzinski from Everton to Fulham, Undisclosed
Tim Cahill from Millwall to Everton, £2m
Claus Jensen from Charlton Athletic to Fulham, £1.25m
Ray Parlour from Arsenal to Middlesbrough, free
27 July 2004 
Ricardo Carvalho from Porto to Chelsea, £19.85m
Papa Bouba Diop from Lens to Fulham, Undisclosed
Josemi from Málaga to Liverpool, £2m
Serhii Rebrov from Tottenham Hotspur to West Ham, free
28 July 2004 
Fernando Hierro from Al Rayyan to Bolton Wanderers, free
29 July 2004 
Henri Camara from Wolves to Celtic season-long loan
Nicky Butt from Manchester United to Newcastle United, £2.5m
Jonathan Greening from Middlesbrough to West Bromwich Albion £1.25m
30 July 2004 
Zoltan Gera from Ferencváros to West Bromwich Albion, £1.5m
Nwankwo Kanu from Arsenal to West Bromwich Albion, free

August

2 August 2004 
Boudewijn Zenden from Chelsea to Middlesbrough, free (making a previous loan deal permanent)
Neil Sullivan from Chelsea to Leeds United, free
5 August 2004 
Mattias Jonson from Brøndby to Norwich City, Undisclosed
10 August 2004
Francis Jeffers from Arsenal to Charlton Athletic, £2.6m
Stephen Carr from Tottenham Hotspur to Newcastle United, Undisclosed
Paolo di Canio from Charlton Athletic to Lazio, free
Darren Anderton from Tottenham Hotspur to Birmingham City, free
12 August 2004
Fitz Hall from Southampton to Crystal Palace, £1.5m
Gabor Kiraly from Hertha Berlin to Crystal Palace, free
13 August 2004 
Michael Owen from Liverpool to Real Madrid, £12m
Antonio Nuñez from Real Madrid to Liverpool, free (Part of Owen deal)
20 August 2004 
Xabi Alonso from Real Sociedad to Liverpool, £10.5m
Luis Garcia from Barcelona to Liverpool, Undisclosed
Jonathan Woodgate from Newcastle United to Real Madrid, £15m
21 August 2004 
Diego Forlán from Manchester United to Villarreal, Undisclosed
24 August 2004
Michael Carrick from West Ham United to Tottenham Hotspur, Undisclosed
28 August 2004 
Seol Ki-hyun from Anderlecht to Wolves, £2m
30 August 2004 
Robert Earnshaw from Cardiff City to West Brom, £3m
31 August 2004 
Junichi Inamoto from Gamba Osaka to West Brom, £200k
Wayne Rooney from Everton to Manchester United, £30m
Dwight Yorke from Blackburn Rovers to Birmingham City, free
Sylvain Wiltord from Arsenal to Lyon, free
Paulo Wanchope from Manchester City to Málaga CF, £500k
Marcus Allbäck from Aston Villa to Hansa Rostock, free
Calum Davenport from Coventry City to Tottenham Hotspur, £3m
Juninho Paulista from Middlesbrough to Celtic, free

Notes and references

Trans
Football transfers summer 2004
Summer 2004